Jamal El-Haj (born 1960) is a Swedish politician, trade unionist and member of the Riksdag, the national legislature. A member of the Social Democratic Party, he has represented Malmö Municipality since September 2018. He had previously been a substitute member of the Riksdag for Leif Jakobsson between June 2016 and September 2018.

El-Haj was educated in Tripoli, Lebanon and has a degree in sociology from the Lebanese University. He has held various roles at the IF Metall trade union. He was a member of the municipal council in Malmö Municipality from 2002 to 2014.

References

1960 births
Lebanese emigrants to Sweden
Lebanese University alumni
Living people
Politicians from Malmö
Members of the Riksdag 2018–2022
Members of the Riksdag 2022–2026
Members of the Riksdag from the Social Democrats
Swedish trade unionists